Sylvia Thier (née Kühnemund; born 25 July 1974 in Sangerhausen) is a retired German athlete who competed primarily in the 1500 metres events. She represented her country at the 1996 Summer Olympics and 1997 World Championships without qualifying for the final. Most of her successes came indoors where she made it to the final at the 1997 and 1999 World Indoor Championships, as well as at the 1996 and 1998 European Indoor Championships.

Competition record

Personal bests
Outdoor
1500 metres – 4:05.96 (Hengelo 1998)
One mile – 4:33.28 (Lausanne 1997)
3000 metres steeplechase – 10:25.38 (Hamburg 2002)
Indoor
1500 metres – 4:06.56 (Paris 1997)
3000 metres – 9:12.50 (Karlsruhe 1999)

References

1974 births
Living people
People from Sangerhausen
German female middle-distance runners
German female steeplechase runners
Athletes (track and field) at the 1996 Summer Olympics
Olympic athletes of Germany
Sportspeople from Saxony-Anhalt